Following is the list of the constituencies in the Jammu and Kashmir Legislative Assembly.

Jammu and Kashmir Reorganisation Act was passed to reconstitute the state of Jammu and Kashmir into union territories of Jammu and Kashmir and Ladakh in 2019. In March 2020, a three-member Delimitation Commission was formed, chaired by retired Justice Ranjana Prakash Desai, for the delimitation of the Union Territory of Jammu and Kashmir. The final delimitation report was released on 5 May 2022 under which additional 6 seats were added to Jammu division and 1 seat to Kashmir division, taking the total tally to 90 seats. The final delimitation report came into force from 20 May 2022.

New List of constituencies
Following is the list of constituencies in the Legislative Assembly of Jammu and Kashmir after delimitation was undertaken in 2022:

Previous List of constituencies

Following is the list of constituencies in the erstwhile state of Jammu and Kashmir:

See also
 Elections in Jammu and Kashmir
 Next Jammu and Kashmir Legislative Assembly election
 List of parliamentary constituencies in Jammu and Kashmir

References

External links
 Jammu and Kashmir Assembly elections 2014, mapsofindia.com

 
Jammu and Kashmir
Constituencies